Rostaq is a village in Takhar Province, Afghanistan. It is the district center of Rustaq District.

Climate
Rostaq has a hot-summer Mediterranean climate (Köppen climate classification Csa).

References 

Populated places in Takhar Province